Club de Futbol Riudellots was a Spanish football team based in Riudellots de la Selva, Girona, in the autonomous community of Catalonia. It last played in Segona Catalana, and their home was Camp Municipal de Riudellots de la Selva.

In June 2011, Riudellots was bought by Girona FC, and subsequently became its reserve team. The club was dissolved in the following year, with Girona FC B taking its place.

Season to season

Notes

Notable players
 Nigel Atangana
 Fran Pérez
 David Juncà
 Marc Rovirola

See also
Girona FC
Girona FC B

References

External links
 

Football clubs in Catalonia
Association football clubs established in 2001
Association football clubs disestablished in 2012
2001 disestablishments in Spain
2012 disestablishments in Spain